Vicki Pepperdine (born 1961) is an English comedy actress and writer. She was nominated for two BAFTA TV Awards for co-writing the BBC sitcom Getting On (2009–12), and was also nominated for a British Comedy Award for her portrayal of Dr Pippa Moore in the series.

Career
Born in London, Pepperdine co-wrote and starred in the multi-award-winning BBC Four sitcom Getting On with Jo Brand and Joanna Scanlan. Shared with Brand and Scanlan, she was nominated for two BAFTA TV Awards for Best Writing, and won two Writers' Guild of Great Britain awards, a Royal Television Society award and a British Comedy Award for her contributions to the show. For radio, she and Melanie Hudson formed the comedy duo Hudson and Pepperdine; the pair wrote and starred in BBC Radio 4's The Hudson and Pepperdine Show from 2000 onwards. Pepperdine hosts a podcast with Julia Davis, entitled Dear Joan and Jericha.

Pepperdine's parents both worked in the NHS in south-west London (partly inspiring Getting On). After studying History of Art at the University of East Anglia, and subsequently working for Help the Aged and in publishing, at the age of 27 Pepperdine applied to East 15 Acting School in Debden, because her heroine Alison Steadman had studied there.

Pepperdine has also had recurring television roles in Julia Davis's Sky Atlantic series Camping; The Woman In White for BBC One; the Channel 4 series High and Dry and The Windsors, the latter of which she played Princess Anne; the BBC Three series Together; the BBC Four sitcom Up the Women; and the  comedy drama Grass. She has appeared in over 50 TV shows, including episodes of Rev, Midsomer Murders, Still Open All Hours, New Tricks, Doc Martin, Twenty Twelve, Lovesick,  frequent collaborator Julia Davis' dark comedy Nighty Night, Jack Dee's Lead Balloon, Steve Coogan's I'm Alan Partridge and Mid Morning Matters, Saxondale, and Miranda Hart's Christmas Unwrapped and Miranda. In 2014, Pepperdine played Harry Hill's housekeeper Mrs Flittersnoop in The Incredible Adventures of Professor Branestawm on BBC One. She played the regular role of midwife Anna Nikolayevna in both series of A Young Doctor's Notebook.

Her theatre work includes the role of Mrs Candour in Deborah Warner's 2011 production of The School for Scandal at the Barbican Centre.

In 2014, she co-wrote, co-produced and starred in  Puppy Love, again with Joanna Scanlan (with whom she established a production company, George and George). Pepperdine is an executive producer on HBO's adaption of Getting On, and reprised her role as Dr Pippa Moore in the season three episode "Am I Still Me?".

In 2017 Pepperdine appeared in comedy feature Eaten by Lions alongside Antonio Aakeel and Jack Carroll, directed by Jason Wingard.

In 2018, she appeared in the Sky Atlantic sitcom Sally4Ever. She also appeared in the 2018 film Johnny English Strikes Again.

In 2019, it was  announced that Pepperdine was working on a new TV show, an adaptation of Lissa Evans' comic novel Old Baggage. In that same year, she appeared as Aunt Sally in the BBC children's miniseries, Worzel Gummidge.

Filmography

Film

Television

References

External links

1961 births
Living people
Alumni of East 15 Acting School
Alumni of the University of East Anglia
English women comedians
English television actresses
English radio actresses
Date of birth missing (living people)